Johnstone Burgh Football Club is a Scottish football club based in Johnstone, Renfrewshire, and play in .

History
The club was formed in 1956, in response to an article in the "Johnstone & Linwood Gazette" newspaper from a journalist that had been ordered out of the newspaper's office on the corner of Johnstone's Rankine Street by the office manager with instructions not to return until he had a story. The journalist proceeded to ask locals what they thought about forming a new football club to replace the former Scottish league side Johnstone F.C.

Their most successful period was in the late 1950s and 1960s when they twice won junior football's top prize – the Scottish Junior Cup. Probably their most successful manager was Jimmy Blackburn who led them to both their Scottish Cup wins as well as West of Scotland Cup and Central League Championship wins. One of our local lads, Bobby Dick, who hails from Elderslie, played what was then right half for the Burgh, and can boast two Scottish Cup winner's medals as well as a number of other medals. In those days the cup final was played at Hampden Park, which made it a day to remember. In later years, Bobby's nephew Alan Donohoe played in goal for the Burgh and was involved in their cup final of 2000.

The 1967-68 season was Johnstone Burgh's most successful season: they won the Scottish Junior Cup, beating Glenrothes 2–1 in extra time after a 2–2 draw at Hampden in the first match. Hugh Gilshan scored the winner. The team also won the Central League Championship and the Evening Times Trophy that season.

Johnstone Burgh has a home support of around 100–150, though this tends to increase vastly when the team is doing well. An OVD Cup tie between Johnstone Burgh and Glenafton Athletic in February 2000 attracted a crowd of over 2000. 

In the 2000 Scottish Junior Cup Final against Whitburn, goals by Colin Lindsay, who later had a spell as manager, and John McLay took the game to penalties after a 2–2 draw. Johnstone Burgh won on penalties in their semi-final at Love Street, but failed to repeat this success in the final.

Ground

Since their foundation, "The Burgh," has been based at James Y. Keanie Park (named after the builder who donated the land the club was built upon). According to "The Juniors, 100 Years A Centenary History of Scottish Football" (McGlone/ McLure) the record attendance was 13,000 v Greenock in the 1963/64 Scottish Junior Cup. The club has much-delayed plans afoot to relocate within the next couple of years to a new ground at the more central Thomas Shanks Memorial Park less than one mile away, built in conjunction with the local council: the perpetually poor drainage at Keanie Park resulting in the regular postponement of home fixtures during the winter months has been a severe financial drain on the side.

It was announced that local team Renfrew Juniors will share Keanie Park Stadium with Johnstone Burgh until October 2014 as a new stadium for Renfrew will not be complete for the start of the 2014–15 season.

Honours
Scottish Junior Cup
 Winners: 1963–64, 1967–68
 Runners-up: 1999–00

Other honours
 Evening Times trophy winners: 1968–69
 West of Scotland Cup winners: 1958–59, 1964–65
 Central League champions: 1958–59, 1964–65, 1967–68
 Central League Premier Division winners: 2001–02
 Central Division Two winners: 1991–92, 2009–10, 2019–20
 Glasgow Dryburgh Cup: 1958–59
 Evening Times Cup Winners Cup: 2001–02

Notable players past and present
After the 1968–1969 season, the most successful in the club's history,  Ian Reid signed for Arbroath, Hugh Gilshan for St Mirren,  Danny Burke to East Fife and Jim McDonald to Leicester City. The following year, Ally Hunter signed for Kilmarnock after replacing George Connolly in goal at Keanie Park the season before. He went on to play for the full Scotland team. One  of the two ball boys from the 1968–69 season, Allan Woods, signed a professional contract with Partick Thistle at just 16 yrs old, under Dave McParland and returned to Johnstone Burgh after three years at Firhill.

 Tommy Turner: Former St Johnstone, Partick Thistle, Morton and St Mirren midfielder.
 Malcolm Manley: Former Scotland Schools International; professional with Leicester City and Portsmouth.
 Allan Woods: Former Scotland Schools international; Partick Thistle midfielder.
 Frank McAvennie: Former St Mirren, West Ham United, Celtic and Scotland striker.
 Andy Murdoch: Former Partick Thistle goalkeeper.
 Gerry Queen: Professional with St Mirren, Kilmarnock, Crystal Palace (English first division 1969–72) and Leyton Orient.

External links 
 Website
 Facebook
 Twitter

References

 
Football clubs in Scotland
Scottish Junior Football Association clubs
Association football clubs established in 1956
Football in Renfrewshire
1956 establishments in Scotland
West of Scotland Football League teams
Johnstone